Werner Richard Karl Hasselblatt (22 June 1890 Tartu – 24 January 1958 Lüneburg, West Germany) was a Baltic-German jurist and politician. He was a member of II Riigikogu.

References

1890 births
1958 deaths
Politicians from Tartu
People from Kreis Dorpat
Baltic-German people
German-Baltic Party politicians
Members of the Riigikogu, 1923–1926
Members of the Riigikogu, 1926–1929
Members of the Riigikogu, 1929–1932
Estonian military personnel of the Estonian War of Independence
Estonian emigrants to Germany